The surname Zacharias and various related forms are derived from the Hebrew given name Zechariah. Notable people with this surname or its variants include:

Medieval period

Bartolomeo Zaccaria (d. 1334), Margrave of Bodonitsa
Benedetto I Zaccaria (c. 1235–1307), Lord of Phocea and Chios
Paleologo Zaccaria (d. 1314), Lord of Phocea and Chios
Benedetto II Zaccaria (d. 1330), Lord of Phocea and Chios
Martino Zaccaria (d. 1345), Lord of Phocea and Chios
Nicolaus Zacharie (c.1400–1466), Italian composer
Stephen or Stefano Zaccaria, Latin Archbishop and Baron of Patras (1405–1424)
Zaharia family, Albanian noble family of the 14th and 15th century (see there for articles on family members)
Abū Bakr Muhammad ibn Zakarīya al-Rāzi (also known as "Razi" and "Rhazes") (865–925 AD), Persian (Iranian) physician, philosopher and scholar

Early Modern period

St. Anthony Maria Zaccaria (1502–1539), Italian priest
Francesco Antonio Zaccaria (1714–1795), Italian theologian and historian

Modern times

Zacarías
Miguel Zacarías (1905–2006), Mexican film director

Zaccaria
Nicola Zaccaria (1923–2007), Greek opera singer

Zacharia
Janine Zacharia, American journalist
Paul Zacharia (born 1945), Indian writer and activist

Zachariae
Karl Eduard Zachariae (1812–1894), German jurist

Zacharias
Christian Zacharias (born 1950), German pianist and conductor
Ernst Zacharias (1924–2020), German musician
Helmut Zacharias (1920–2002), German violinist and composer
Jerrold R. Zacharias (1905–1986), American scientist and engineer
Otto Zacharias (1846–1916), German biologist and popular scientific journalist
Ravi Zacharias (1946–2020), Canadian-American author and Christian apologist
Sascha Zacharias (born 1979), Swedish actress
Thomas Zacharias (baseball) (died 1892), American baseball umpire
Thomas Zacharias (high jump) (born 1947), German high jumper

Zachary
Chris Zachary (1944–2003), American baseball player
Tom Zachary (1896–1944), American baseball player

Zachery
James Zachery (1958–1994), American football player

Zachry
Pat Zachry (born 1952), American baseball player

Zaharia
Zaharia, dedicated article for the Albanian and Romanian variant of the name

Zaharias
Mildred "Babe" Zaharias (1911–1956), versatile American athlete

Zakaria
Fareed Zakaria (born 1964), Indian-American journalist
Rafiq Zakaria (1920–2005), Indian politician and Islamic scholar

See also
Zacharias (given name), the main article about the name Zacharias and its many variants (Zechariah, Zachariah, Zachary, etc.)
Zakariya, Arabic form of the name
Zakaryan, Eastern Armenian form of the name

Indian surnames
Surnames from given names